John de Mendoza (born 22 August 1949) is a British former professional tennis player.

A British top-10 player, de Mendoza was active on the international tour in the 1970s. He featured in the singles main draws of both the French Open and Wimbledon during his career. In 1972 he had an upset win over Clark Graebner in the semifinals of the Welsh Championships and finished tournament runner-up to Andrew Pattison.

References

External links
 
 

1949 births
Living people
British male tennis players
English male tennis players
Tennis people from Greater London